A spaniel is a type of gun dog. Spaniels were especially bred to flush game out of denser brush. By the late 17th century, spaniels had been specialized into water and land breeds. The extinct English Water Spaniel was used to retrieve water fowl shot down with arrows. Land spaniels were setting spaniels—those that crept forward and pointed their game, allowing hunters to ensnare them with nets, and springing spaniels—those that sprang pheasants and partridges for hunting with falcons, rabbits and smaller mammals such as rats and mice for hunting with greyhounds. During the 17th century, the role of the spaniel dramatically changed as Englishmen began hunting with flintlocks for wing shooting. Charles Goodall and Julia Gasow (1984) write that spaniels were "transformed from untrained, wild beaters, to smooth, polished gun dogs."

The word "spaniel" would seem to be derived from the medieval French espaigneul"Spanish"to modern French, espagnol.

Definition and description

The Oxford English Dictionary defines Spaniel as "a breed of dog with a long silky coat and drooping ears".

Not much has changed about spaniels in general over the years, as can be seen in this 1921 entry in Collier's New Encyclopedia:

Their distinguishing characteristics are a rather broad muzzle, remarkably long and full ears, hair plentiful and beautifully waved, particularly that of the ears, tail, and hinder parts of the thighs and legs. The prevailing color is liver and white, sometimes red and white or black and white, and sometimes deep brown, or black on the face and breast, with a tan spot over each eye. The English spaniel is a superior and very pure breed. The King Charles is a small variety of the spaniel used as a lapdog. The water spaniels, large and small, differ from the common spaniel only in the roughness of their coats, and in uniting the aquatic propensities of the Newfoundland dog with the fine hunting qualities of their own race. Spaniels possess a great share of intelligence, affection, and obedience, which qualities, combined with much beauty, make them highly prized as companions.

History

The origin of the word spaniel is described by the Oxford English Dictionary as coming from the Old French word espaigneul which meant "Spanish (dog)"; this in turn originated from the Latin Hispaniolus which simply means "Spanish".

In Edward, 2nd Duke of York's work The Master of Game, which was mostly a 15th-century translation of an earlier work by Gaston III of Foix-Béarn entitled Livre de chasse, spaniels are described as being from Spain as much as all Greyhounds are from England or Scotland. Sixteenth-century English physician John Caius wrote that the spaniels of the time were mostly white, marked with spots that are commonly red. He described a new variety to have come out of France, which were speckled all over with white and black, "which mingled colours incline to a marble blewe".

Celtic origin theory
In the appendices added to the 1909 re-print of Caius' work, the editors suggested that the type of dogs may have been brought into the British Isles as early as 900 BC by a branch of the Celts moving from Spain into Cornwall and on into Wales, England and Ireland. Theories on the origin of the Welsh Springer Spaniel support this theory, as it is believed that the breed specifically is a direct descendant of the "Agassian hunting dog" described in the hunting poem Cynegetica attributed to Oppian of Apamea, which belonged to the Celtic tribes of Roman Britain:

There is a strong breed of hunting dog, small in size but no less worthy of great praise. These the wild tribes of Britons with their tattooed backs rear and call by the name of Agassian. Their size is like that of worthless and greedy domestic table dogs; squat, emaciated, shaggy, dull of eye, but endowed with feet armed with powerful claws and a mouth sharp with close-set venomous tearing teeth. It is by virtue of its nose, however, that the Agassian is most exalted, and for tracking it is the best there is; for it is very adept at discovering the tracks of things that walk upon the ground, and skilled too at marking the airborne scent.

Roman origin theory
Another theory of the origin of the spaniel is that the ancient Romans imported spaniels into Britannia by way of the trade routes to the Far East. Colonel David Hancock adds a belief that the sporting type of spaniel originated in China from the short-faced ancestors of dogs such as the Pekingese, Pug and Shih Tzu. The theory goes that these ancestors were introduced into Southern Europe and evolved into the small sporting spaniels of the period around AD 1300–1600. The issue of how a short-muzzled dog could evolve into a longer-muzzled dog is addressed by pointing to the evolution of the King Charles Spaniel into the Cavalier King Charles Spaniel in less than a century.

Hunting

In assisting hunters, it is desirable that spaniels work within gun range, are steady to shot, and are able to mark the fall and retrieve shot game to hand with a soft mouth. A good nose is highly valued, as it is in most gun dog breeds. They are versatile hunters traditionally being used for upland game birds, but are equally adept at hunting rabbits, waterfowl, rats, and mice. Whether hunting in open fields, woodlands, farm lands—in briars, along fencerows or marshlands, a spaniel can get the job done.

On the basis of function and hunting style, the Fédération Cynologique Internationale (FCI) draws a distinction between Continental and Anglo-American spaniels. The FCI places Continental dogs of the spaniel type in the pointing group (Group 7, sect. 1.2) because they function more like setters which "freeze" and point to game. Breeds in this group include the Blue Picardy Spaniel, the French Spaniel, the Brittany, the Pont-Audemer Spaniel, and the Small Münsterländer. The FCI classifies most other dogs of the spaniel type as flushing or water dogs (Group 8, sections 2 and 3).

Breeds

Contemporary

Extinct

Misnamed
The following breeds are not true spaniels, but are named as such due to their resemblance to the spaniels.

See also
 Dogs portal
 List of dog breeds
 Alanorarius, a keeper of spaniels
 Hunting dog
 Dog type

Citations

General references

External links 

 Journal "Spaniel" (rus) / journalspaniel.ru
 Journal "Spaniel"  (eng) / spanieljournal.com

 

Dog types
Hunting dogs